Marquess of Daroca is a hereditary  title of Spanish nobility. It was created on 1 December 2011 by King Juan Carlos I of Spain in favor of Antonio Mingote, a cartoonist, writer and journalist. The title recalls the name of his hometown, the town of Daroca.

Marquesses of Daroca (2011)
 Antonio Mingote, 1st Marquess of Daroca (2011–2012) 
 Pablo Mingote Fernández, 2nd Marquess of Daroca (2012- ), grandson of the 1st Marquess

References

Marquessates in the Spanish nobility
Noble titles created in 2011